Uglješa Uzelac (1938 – 6 September 1997) was a Bosnian politician and diplomat who served as the 27th Mayor of Sarajevo from 1983 until 1985 and was Bosnia and Herzegovina's Ambassador to Slovenia from 1992 until his death on 6 September 1997.

He was also the President of the Basketball Federation of Yugoslavia from 1989 to 1991.

Biography
Uzelac was born in 1938 in the village of Ivanjska, Bosanska Krupa near Banja Luka. He was educated in Sarajevo, where he graduated from the Faculty of Economics and Business. He worked at the UPI Bank of Sarajevo, and was also director of it.

Uzelac was the president of the Assembly of KK Bosna, President of the Basketball Federation of Yugoslavia and a member of the Organizing Committee of the 1984 Winter Olympics in Sarajevo. He served as the 27th Mayor of Sarajevo from 1983 until 1985 and was mayor during the Winter Olympics.

Uzelac died on 6 September 1997, while serving as Bosnia and Herzegovina's ambassador to Slovenia.

References

External links
Uglješa Uzelac at fis-gol83-91.com.ba

1938 births
1997 deaths
People from Bosanska Krupa
Yugoslav politicians
Bosnia and Herzegovina politicians
Mayors of Sarajevo
Bosnia and Herzegovina diplomats
Ambassadors of Bosnia and Herzegovina to Slovenia